Belanda Bor, or just Bor, is a Luo language of South Sudan. Most speakers also use Belanda Viri, which is a Ubangian language and not at all related.

Obtaining scientific/ linguistic information about the Belanda language posed a lot of challenges than expected. First, there were many gaps in the history of the language, also a lot of contradictories were encountered which reduced the clarity of the endeavour.

When the history of the Belanda Boor ethnic group is considered, the reason for this lack of coherence can probably be linked to the conflicts shared by the various ethnic groups, slave raids and civil wars, as most of the Belanda Boor people were forced to leave their homelands and settle in the Western Equatoria. Another possible reason leading to the lack of proper history is the independence of South Sudan which led to more contradictions and lack of proper recordings about the Belanda Boor group.

There are currently 40 – 50,000 speakers of the language in the South Sudan.

Belanda Boor – The etymology

The term Belanda Boor is used to denote both the language and the people. To distinguish between both meanings, a prefix is added.

Joo-boor – the community

Di- boor – the language.

Belanda Boor is formed from the autonym Boor and the central-Sudanic Bongo word Beerlanda. In Bongo, beer is the ethnonym for all their Lwoo speaking neighbours. The word “landa” means hills and mountains.

Classification

Belanda Boor belongs to the Nilo-Saharan group and is spoken in South Sudan. It is further classified as Nilotic, western Nilotic, and northern lawoo.

Phonology

Syllable Structure

For many western Nilotic languages, the syllabic structure is monosyllabic which is also the case for Boor. Typical for the Belanda Boor language also is that most of the nouns have no affixes in the singular form and in the plural, they maintain prefixes. The syllables in the Belanda Boor languages are either open or closed. Open Syllables can be high or heavy.

Phonemes

Consonants 
Belanda Boor has 29 consonant phonemes. There is a vast difference between typical Lwoo consonants systems. They exist as fricatives and labiovelars.

Vowels 
Many of the Lwoo languages have the vowel system of the five ATR+ and ATR- vowels.

Belanda Boor has two phonologically categorised sets of vowels. These vowels are distinguished by the position of the tongue root as either of ATR+ or ART- quality. The vowel inventory of Boor reflects an ATR system.

A significant difference between the Boor and other languages is that Belanda Boor is not prone to vowel harmony, even if there are traces.

Nouns 
Belanda Boor nouns are defined morphosyntactically as they comprise only the categories of words which can be marked based on numbers. The gender of nouns can also be linked to the gender marking prefixes.In the Belanda Boor language, the agent is always the subject of the clause, their roles are syntactically realised when used with the object of a verb or the object of a preposition.

The word order of Belanda Boor is SVO. The role of the word classes is determined according to their position in the order. It is also possible to identify nouns according to their semantic behaviours. Belanda Boor distinguishes a large number of semantic categories for nouns. Nouns typically refer to concepts which are time-stable.

Types of Nouns 

The Nouns of the language Belanda Boor exhibit a rather wide range of canonical forms in various tone patterns. Tone is reduced in Belanda Boor, so it doesn’t has any grammatical function. All the minimal pairs of the lexicon differ in vowel length and quality, but not in tone. 

The majority of the Basic Nouns in Belanda Boor are of the CV(V) pattern and only few of them exhibit the shape CV (V).

In Belanda Boor we will find various types and nouns which only consist of the pure stem. Complex nouns exhibit a stem and up to their prefixed morphemes. Only a derivational prefix or a classifier can be attached at a time, but never both. 

(1)    morphological structures 

(1a) structures including a derivational prefix

Number marker+ derivational prefix+ petrified sex+ stem+ petrified suffix

(1b) Structures including a classifier 

Classifier+ number marker+ petrified sex+ stem+ petrified suffix 

The Verb

The structure of the Verbs

Belanda Boor follows the typical CVC structure for the verb roots, similar to the roots of basic nouns. Verbs in Belanda Boor denote usually actions, however there are some exceptions like stative verbs. 

The syntactic position of verbs either SVO or SV . although there are exceptions, but the verb  always follows the subject. Another way to identify verbs is according to their morphosyllabic  behaviour. In this case verbs can be marked for grammatical categories like TAM-tense, aspect and mood and person. 

Structure of Verbs 

Here are some examples for the CVC structure in Belanda Boor by Beatrix von Heyking.

CVC

High- Tone kwác   ‘to beg’

Mid-Tone cãm        ‘to eat’

Low-Tone màd̪       ‘to drink’

In Belanda Boor there are verbs which lack the final consonant and are thus of CV or CVV structure 

Some examples 

CV (V)

Mid tone mbū ‘be tired’

Low tone mbù  ‘leave sth’

Mid tone wīī      ‘allow sth’

The first two examples can be traced to be loans from Ubanga, which probably entered Boor via Belanda Bviri. 

Another pattern for verbs is CVCV. The final vowel belongs not to the verb stem. 

HHH méd médɔ́  ‘to dance’

MM  cãm cãm     ‚to eat’

LL      lèg lèk           ‘to dream’

Summarising Tam 

Here is an overview of all the inventory markers for tense/ aspects and moods 

Tense 

Present perfective : ni

Past perfective:        a- 

Future perfective:    uku 

Present imperfective: na 

Past imperfective:     (ɲiki) na 

Aspects 

Completive:           ɲika

Incompletive:         ɲiki

Habitual:                  u-

Completive habitual: dɛka

Incompletive habitual: dɛki

Negative habitual:        kʊ

Final:                               yɔkɔ 

Mood

Evidential: kɪ

Imperative: (syntactical means)

Negative imperative: ni

Hortative: (syntactical means)

References

Definitely endangered languages
Luo languages